John Hart Hunter (May 3, 1807 – February 12, 1872) is recognized as the father of the American college fraternity system. He founded the Kappa Alpha Society (KA) in 1825 at Union College.

Early life
John Hart Hunter was born on May 3, 1807. His father, John Hunter, emigrated from Dublin, Ireland to Philadelphia in 1805 and then soon to New York where he worked as a bookkeeper.  The elder John Hunter married Sarah Hart of White Plains. Hunter, a superb mathematician, soon gave up business for teaching. He also passed on his love for scholarship to his only son, John Hart Hunter.  The younger Hunter developed his early education by extensive reading at the Apprentices' Public Library in New York.

College life
John Hart Hunter entered college directly into the Junior Class at Union in 1824. He quickly became one of the leading academic scholars of the school at age 17. When Arthur Burtis Jr. entered Union in 1825 (also as a Junior following two years at Columbia), college president Eliphalet Nott personally insisted Hunter take him under his wing as roommate. Thus Hunter's plans for a single room were disrupted, and indirectly President Nott had set the stage for the foundation of Kappa Alpha. On November 26, 1825, John Hart Hunter founded the Kappa Alpha Society, the world's first Greek letter social fraternity, along with eight other students: six of them seniors in the class of 1826, and two juniors of the class of 1827.

Upon graduating near the top of his class at Union in 1826, Hunter was admitted to the Princeton Theological Seminary where he studied until 1828.

After Union
Hunter was called in 1828 to serve as pastor of the Congregational Church of Fairfield, Connecticut. During his six-year tenure at Fairfield, he developed into a powerful preacher.

John Hunter married Julia Maria Judson in 1830. Julia was a well-educated member of a prominent Stratford, Connecticut, family. She was born on January 11, 1811, in Stratford to Daniel and Sarah Judson. Julia graduated from Troy Female Seminary in 1827. John and Julia Hunter had nine children, including Daniel Judson Hunter, Julia E. Hunter, Kate P. Hunter, James Hunter, and Mary H. Hunter and four others.

John Hart Hunter went on to serve as pastor of churches at West Springfield, Massachusetts, Bridgeport, Connecticut, and Nanville, Kentucky.

In 1851, Hunter moved west to Missouri with his son James, age 19, in hopes of improving the financial situation of his growing family.  They had hoped to profit from land that Hunter had bought several years earlier.  Hunter put the land to work for industrial purposes rather than simple farming.  He later traded the land in Missouri for deeds to land in Texas.  John Hart Hunter died of Congestion of the Lungs on February 12, 1872, at City Hospital in Galveston, Texas.  He was buried the next day, February 13, 1872, in Galveston's Potter's field which is known today as Municipal Cemetery located at 61st Street and Avenue T 1/2.

Julia Maria Judson Hunter died at the age of 95 on Saturday, October 14, 1905, at her home at 62 W 93rd Street in New York City. Prior to her death, Julia had been instrumental in campaigning for her late friend Emma Willard's induction into the Hall of Fame for Great Americans. John and Julia's son Daniel Judson Hunter died at the age of 62 on February 2, 1907, at his home in New York.

References

External links

1872 deaths
College fraternity founders
1807 births
Princeton Theological Seminary alumni
Union College (New York) alumni
People from Fairfield, Connecticut
Kappa Alpha Society